Tom Dennis was a professional rugby league footballer who played in the 1930s. He played at club level for Castleford (Heritage № 121), and the Featherstone Rovers (Heritage № 124).

Playing career

County League appearances
Tom Dennis played in Castleford's victory in the Yorkshire County League during the 1932–33 season.

Club career
Tom Dennis made his début for the Featherstone Rovers on Saturday 3 February 1934, and he played his last match for the Featherstone Rovers during the 1937–38 season.

References

External links
Search for "Dennis" at rugbyleagueproject.org
Dennis Memory Box Search at archive.castigersheritage.com

Castleford Tigers players
English rugby league players
Featherstone Rovers players
Place of birth missing
Place of death missing
Year of birth missing
Year of death missing